Sphenophorus melanocephalus is a species of beetle in the family Curculionidae found in North America. Because type specimens were unavailable, the name once was misused for a different species, Sphenophorus nubilus.

References

Dryophthorinae
Articles created by Qbugbot
Beetles described in 1801